Department for Infrastructure Roads or DfI Roads (formerly Transport NI, and the Roads Service) is the public body responsible for the upkeep and maintenance of highways and roads in Northern Ireland in the United Kingdom.  It is an executive agency of the Department for Infrastructure.

The agency has over 2,000 staff and as such employs more people than its parent department. In 2010-11 the agency was responsible for just over 25,000 kilometres (15,534 miles) of public roads, approximately 9,500 kilometres (5,903 miles) of footways, 5,800 bridges, 265,000 streetlights and 370 public car parks.

DfI Roads was part of the Department of the Environment but was transferred to the then Department for Regional Development (DRD) upon the latter's creation in 1998. In 2016, DRD became the Department for Infrastructure.

References

External links
 DfI Roads Website

Northern Ireland Executive
Economy of Northern Ireland
Road transport in Northern Ireland
Road authorities
Transport organisations based in the United Kingdom